Many lists exist that provide an overview of large software companies, often called "independent software vendors" ("ISVs"), in the world. The lists differ by methodology of composition and consequently show substantial differences in both listed companies and ranking of those companies.

Legend

Forbes Global 2000 
The Forbes Global 2000 is an annual ranking of the top 2000 public companies in the world by Forbes magazine, based on a mix of four metrics: sales, profit, assets and market value. The Forbes list for software companies includes only pure play (or nearly pure play) software companies and excludes manufacturers, consumer electronics companies, conglomerates, IT consulting firms, and computer services companies even if they have large software divisions.

The top 46 companies in terms of market capitalization in the 2019 Forbes list for the "Software & Programming" industry are listed in the following table:

All values listed in the table are in billion US$.

See also 
 List of largest technology companies by revenue
 List of largest manufacturing companies by revenue
 List of largest United States–based employers globally
 List of largest employers
 Economy of the United States

References

External links 

Lists of information technology companies
Lists of companies by revenue
Economy-related lists of superlatives